USS Lewis B. Puller may refer to:

  was an  launched 1980 and transferred to Egypt 1998.
  is the first expeditionary mobile base (ESB) variant of expeditionary transfer dock ships, launched in 2014 and in active service

United States Navy ship names